{{DISPLAYTITLE:C38H38O16}}
The molecular formula C38H38O16 (molar mass: 750.70 g/mol, exact mass: 750.2160 u) may refer to:

 Dicerandrol C
 Phomoxanthone A (PXA)
 Phomoxanthone B (PXB)

Molecular formulas